Blandings is a British comedy television series adapted by Guy Andrews from the Blandings Castle stories of P. G. Wodehouse. It was first broadcast on BBC One from 13 January 2013, and stars Timothy Spall, Jennifer Saunders, Jack Farthing, Tim Vine and Mark Williams.
The series was produced with the partial financial assistance of the European Regional Development Fund.

Plot
Set in 1929, Lord Emsworth (Spall) resides at Blandings Castle, along with his imperious sister  Connie (Saunders), his empty-headed son Freddie (Jack Farthing), and any number of houseguests, love-struck nieces and their boyfriends. He would rather be left in peace with his prize pig The Empress, but his family is always at hand to complicate his life. Offering a reluctant helping hand is his loyal and long-suffering butler, Beach (Mark Williams/Tim Vine).

Production

The series was produced by Mammoth Screen and was filmed on location at Crom Castle, near Newtownbutler, in County Fermanagh, Northern Ireland. Some scenes were also filmed at Florence Court, a National Trust property near Kinawley in south-west County Fermanagh. The producer was Spencer Campbell and the director was Paul Seed. It was the first adaptation of Blandings for British television since the BBC's film of Wodehouse's novel Heavy Weather in 1995.

On 7 June 2013, BBC commissioner Danny Cohen confirmed that Blandings would return for a second series.
The second series has seven episodes and began airing 16 February 2014.

On 24 October 2013, it was announced that Tim Vine would join the cast for the second series as Beach replacing Mark Williams.

Cast and characters

Main

Timothy Spall as Clarence Threepwood, 9th Earl of Emsworth
Jennifer Saunders as  Lady Constance Keeble
Jack Farthing as  The Hon. Frederick Threepwood
Mark Williams as Sebastian Beach (series 1)
Tim Vine as Sebastian Beach (series 2)

Recurring
Ron Donachie as Angus McAllister
Robert Bathurst as Sir Gregory Parsloe-Parsloe

Episodes

Series 1 (2013)

Series 2 (2014)

Reception
Ben Lawrence of The Daily Telegraph awarded the first episode two stars out of five and wrote that the lack of Wodehouse's "authorial voice", ever present in the books to add "clarity and depth" and "invest psychological complexity into [the] characters", left the cast "all at sea".

Tributes were paid to Empress, the Middle White sow used in the show, when she died from what vets believe was a "massive heart attack" just before the final episode was broadcast. Timothy Spall said he was "very upset" at the news.

References

External links

2010s British sitcoms
2013 British television series debuts
2014 British television series endings
BBC high definition shows
BBC television sitcoms
Television series by Mammoth Screen
Television series by ITV Studios
English-language television shows
Television shows set in Shropshire
Television shows based on works by P. G. Wodehouse